Aliabad (also Romanized as ‘Alīābād) is a village in Margha Rural District, in the Central District of Izeh County, Khuzestan Province, Iran. At the 2006 census, its population was 51, in 8 families.

References 

Populated places in Izeh County